Govindpuri is a Delhi Metro station in Delhi. It is located between Kalkaji Mandir and Harkesh Nagar Okhla stations on the Violet Line. The station was opened with the first section of the Line on 3 October 2010, in time for the Commonwealth Games opening ceremony on the same day.

The station

Station layout

Facilities
List of available ATM at Govindpuri metro station are State Bank of India, Yes Bank, Canara Bank

Entry/Exit

Connections

Bus
Delhi Transport Corporation bus routes number 8A, 47A, 47ACL, 311A, 411, 411LnkSTL, 411STL, 429, 433, 433A, 433LnkSTL, 445A, 445STL, 463, 469, 480, 511, 511A, 764EXT, 774, 874, Crossings Republik - Golf Course Road Gurugram, Noida City Center - Cyber City, OMS (+) (-), OMS (+) AC serves the station from outside metro station stop.

Good place to visit Govindpuri, Kalka ji, Sangam vihar

See also

Delhi
Govindpuri
List of Delhi Metro stations
Transport in Delhi
Delhi Metro Rail Corporation
Delhi Suburban Railway
Delhi Monorail
Delhi Transport Corporation
South East Delhi
New Delhi
National Capital Region (India)
List of rapid transit systems
List of metro systems

References

External links

 Delhi Metro Rail Corporation Ltd. (Official site) 
 Delhi Metro Annual Reports
 
 UrbanRail.Net – Descriptions of all metro systems in the world, each with a schematic map showing all stations.

Delhi Metro stations
Railway stations opened in 2010
Railway stations in South Delhi district